Clube de Rugby do Técnico or C.R. Técnico is a Portuguese rugby union club.

Técnico has won 3 Championships and 4 Portuguese Cup's. It was founded in 1963, by four rugby union players and students of Técnico, Alfredo Santos, José Luis Steiger, José Metelo and Pedro Sousa Ribeiro.

In the late eighties, it set out to build his own field in Olaias, leaving Estádio Universitário de Lisboa where it used to play.

C.R Técnico has all age groups teams, from Under 8 to Veterans, including 2 senior teams and a women's side also.

Honours
Campeonato Nacional Honra/Super Bock:
Winner (3): 1981, 1998, 2021
Taça de Portugal de Rugby:
Winner (4): 1969, 1971, 1973, 1994

References

External links
 Website

Clube Rugby do Tecnico
Rugby clubs established in 1963
University and college sports clubs in Portugal
Sport in Lisbon